Shazada Muhammad Shah-Rukh (2 October 1926 – 6 September 2015) was a Pakistani field hockey player and cyclist. He competed in the field hockey event at the 1948 Summer Olympics and in four cycling events at the 1956 Summer Olympics.

References

External links
 

1926 births
2015 deaths
Pakistani male field hockey players
Pakistani male cyclists
Field hockey players at the 1948 Summer Olympics
Olympic field hockey players of Pakistan
Olympic cyclists of Pakistan
Cyclists at the 1956 Summer Olympics
Cyclists from Lahore
Asian Games medalists in cycling
Cyclists at the 1958 Asian Games
Medalists at the 1958 Asian Games
Asian Games silver medalists for Pakistan
Asian Games bronze medalists for Pakistan
Commonwealth Games competitors for Pakistan
Cyclists at the 1958 British Empire and Commonwealth Games
Field hockey players from Lahore
20th-century Pakistani people